Möðrudalur is a farm settlement in Norður-Múlasýsla in Eastern Iceland, and the highest inhabited place in the country, at 469 m (1,539 ft) above sea level.

Möðrudalur is a popular tourist destination, and was formerly located on The Ring Road until the road was moved to its current Háreksstaðaleið route to the north of Möðrudalur.

A church was built in Möðrudalur in 1949 by Jón A. Stefánsson. A guesthouse, a small store and a restaurant are operated in the area. Nearby the settlement one finds also the Kunsthalle Tropical. 

The lowest temperature ever recorded in Iceland, -38.0 °C (-36.4 °F) was recorded concurrently in Möðrudalur and the neighboring Grímsstaðir on 21 January 1918.

Gallery

References

Populated places in Eastern Region (Iceland)